Sir John Blount (by 1471 – 27 February 1531) was an English politician.

He was born the eldest son of Sir Thomas Blount of Kinlet Hall, Shropshire. He succeeded his father c.1525 and was knighted in 1529.

He served as a Justice of the Peace (J.P.) for Staffordshire in 1520–1526 and for Shropshire from 1529 to his death. He fought as a captain in the English army besieging Tournai in 1513 and later accompanied Henry VIII to France in 1520 to attend the famous meeting between Henry and Francis I of France at the Field of the Cloth of Gold.

He was appointed High Sheriff of Staffordshire for 1526–27 and was elected a Member (MP) of the Parliament of England for Shropshire in 1529. He was also pricked High Sheriff of Shropshire for 1530–31 but died in office in 1531. He was buried at Kinlet church, where there is a tomb monument to himself and his wife.

 
He married at Kinlet on 1 August 1492  Catherine, the daughter and coheiress of Hugh Peshall of Knightley, with whom he had three sons and five daughters. His daughter, Elizabeth, was a Lady-in-Waiting to Catherine of Aragon. She also gave Henry VIII his only recognized, illegitimate son, Henry Fitzroy, Duke of Richmond.  He was succeeded by his eldest son George, also to be an MP and High Sheriff.

References

15th-century births
1531 deaths
English MPs 1529–1536
High Sheriffs of Staffordshire
High Sheriffs of Shropshire